Lithacrosiphon is a genus of worms belonging to the family Aspidosiphonidae.

The species of this genus are found in all world oceans.

Species:

Lithacrosiphon cristatus 
Subsp. L. c. cristatus 
Subsp. L. c. lakshadweepensis 
Lithacrosiphon maldivensis 
Lithacrosiphon uniscutatus

History 

L. cristatus was redescribed and included the formerly distinct species L. altriconus, L. gurjanovae, L. indicus, and L. odhneri.

L. uniscutatus was redescribed and included L. kukenthali and L. poritidis.

References

Sipunculans